was a town located in Yazu District, Tottori Prefecture, Japan.

As of 2003, the town had an estimated population of 5,299 and a density of 78.49 persons per km2. The total area was 67.51 km2.

On March 31, 2005, Hattō, along with the towns of Funaoka and Kōge (all from Yazu District), was merged to create the town of Yazu.

Hattō was known for its lively fish markets.

References

External links
Yazu official website 

Dissolved municipalities of Tottori Prefecture
Yazu, Tottori